The Woman's Club of Fall River is a historic building at 1542 Walnut Street in Fall River, Massachusetts. It was originally constructed in 1897 and remodeled in 1925 in the Colonial Revival style, by local architect Maude Darling Parlin, a graduate of the Massachusetts Institute of Technology.  Notable Colonial Revival features include the projecting entrance pavilion, which has a fully pedimented gable with oriel window, Corinthian pilasters separating the baysm and a pedimented entry with transom window.

The building was originally a private school. During the 1910s it served as St. Paul's Evangelical Lutheran Church before its adaptation for use by the Woman's Club.

It was added to the National Register of Historic Places in 1983.

See also
National Register of Historic Places listings in Fall River, Massachusetts

References

Clubhouses on the National Register of Historic Places in Massachusetts
Buildings and structures in Fall River, Massachusetts
Women's club buildings
History of women in Massachusetts
National Register of Historic Places in Fall River, Massachusetts